Näsvikens IK is a Swedish football club located in Näsviken in Hudiksvall Municipality, mostly famous for fostering forward Tomas Brolin.

Background
Näsvikens IK currently plays in Division 4 Hälsingland which is the sixth tier of Swedish football. They play their home matches at the Tunet in Näsviken.

The club is affiliated to Hälsinglands Fotbollförbund.

Footnotes

External links
 Näsvikens IK – Official website
 Näsvikens IK on Facebook

Football clubs in Gävleborg County
1950 establishments in Sweden